John W. Carter was a partner in Carter's Ink Company in Boston and later Cambridge, Massachusetts, from 1865 until his death by drowning in 1895. The firm was founded by his cousin, William Carter.

His son, Richard B. Carter, ran the company from 1905 until his death in 1949. The company was sold in 1975 to Dennison Manufacturing Company, now Avery Dennison Corporation. The Carter's brand name survives on some of its products.

See also
Avery Dennison Corporation

Fountain pen and ink manufacturers
1895 deaths
Year of birth missing